Ectypia is a genus of moths in the family Erebidae. The genus was erected by James Brackenridge Clemens in 1861.

Species
Ectypia bivittata Clemens, 1861
Ectypia clio (Packard, 1864) – Clio tiger moth
Ectypia mexicana (Dognin, 1911)

References

Phaegopterina
Moth genera